Carijós Ecological Station is a coastal marine ecological station in Florianópolis, Santa Catarina, Brazil.

Location

It is managed by the Chico Mendes Institute for Biodiversity Conservation.

Conservation

Carijós Ecological Station contains part of the Atlantic forest biome and is fully protected.
The purpose is conservation of the mangrove ecosystem on Santa Catarina Island.
The station is closed to the public, with visits allowed only for  environmental education purposes.
As of 2009 the Ecological Station was a "strict nature reserve" under IUCN protected area category Ia.
In 2013 the ecological station and the National Center for Research and Conservation of Wild Birds (CEMAVE) were involved in monitoring the health of wild birds in federally-administered conservation units of Florianópolis.
This was the first systematic study of the prevalence of diseases and parasites of the local avifauna.

References

Sources

1987 establishments in Brazil
Ecological stations of Brazil
Protected areas of Santa Catarina (state)
Protected areas established in 1987
Protected areas of the Atlantic Forest